The Maria J. and Juan Trujillo House is a historic adobe house in Dwyer, New Mexico. It was probably built in the 1870s, although possibly as early as 1836. It belonged to homesteaders Juan Evangelista Trujillo and Maria Jesus Trujillo in 1882. The house was designed in the Vernacular Spanish-Mexican architectural style. It has been listed on the National Register of Historic Places since May 16, 1988.

It was listed on the National Register as part of a 1988 study of historic resources in the Mimbres Valley of Grant County.

References

Adobe buildings and structures in New Mexico
Houses on the National Register of Historic Places in New Mexico
National Register of Historic Places in Grant County, New Mexico